The City of Campbelltown is a local government area in the Macarthur region of south-western Sydney, in New South Wales, Australia.

The Mayor of the City of Campbelltown is Cr. George Greiss, a member of the Liberal Party.

Suburbs 
Suburbs in the City of Campbelltown are:

Demographics
At the  there were  people in the Campbelltown local government area, of these 49% were male and 51% were female. Aboriginal and Torres Strait Islander people made up 3.8% of the population; 30% more than the NSW and Australian averages of 2.9% and 2.8% respectively. The median age of people in the City of Campbelltown was 34 years, which is significantly lower than the national median of 37 years. Children aged 0 – 14 years made up 21.6% of the population and people aged 65 years and over made up 11.8% of the population. Of people in the area aged 15 years and over, 47.1% were married and 87% were either divorced or separated.

At the 2016 census, the population in the Campbelltown Local Government Area increased by 7.56%. When compared with total population growth of Australia for the same period, being 8.8%, population growth in the Campbelltown Local Government Area was slightly below the national average. The median weekly income for residents within the Campbelltown Local Government Area was generally on par with the national average.

Council

Current composition and election method
Campbelltown City Council is composed of fifteen Councillors elected proportionally as one entire ward. All Councillors are elected for a fixed four-year term of office. The Mayor is elected by the councillors at the first meeting of the council. The most recent Council election was held on 4 December 2021, and the makeup of the council is as follows:

The current Council, elected in 2021, in order of election, is:

Past Mayors

History and growth 

Campbelltown was founded in 1820, named after Elizabeth Macquarie née Campbell, wife of the then Governor Lachlan Macquarie.

Campbelltown Council was originally incorporated on 21 January 1882. The present boundaries of the City of Campbelltown were largely formed in 1949, following the amalgamation of the Municipalities of Ingleburn (incorporated in April 1896) and Campbelltown, as part of a rationalisation of local government areas across New South Wales following World War II. Campbelltown was presented with its own coat of arms in 1969. The coat of arms were based those on the arms of the Campbell family in Scotland.

Campbelltown was designated as a satellite city and a regional capital for the south west of Sydney in the early 1960s in the Sydney Region Outline Plan, prepared by the Planning Commission of New South Wales. There was extensive building and population growth in the intervening time and the government surrounded the township with areas which were set aside for public and private housing and industry.

Campbelltown was declared a city on 4 May 1968 by the Hon. Pat Morton, Minister for Local Government and Highways. That same day saw the arrival of the first electric train to Campbelltown from Sydney.

As a city, Campbelltown honoured the 1st Signals Regiment (now the 1st Joint Support Unit) with the medieval custom of the Freedom of the city. The mayor, Alderman Clive Tregear, wanted to recognise the contribution to the units based at the Ingleburn Army Barracks. The regiment marched through Campbelltown until it got transferred to Queensland in the 1980s.

Opened in 2005, the Campbelltown Arts Centre is a cultural facility of Campbelltown City Council that is partially funded by the New South Wales Government through Create NSW.

Heritage listings 
The City of Campbelltown has a number of heritage-listed sites, including:
 Campbelltown, Broughton Street: St John's Catholic Church, Campbelltown
 Campbelltown, 8 Lithgow Street: Glenalvon House
 Campbelltown, 14 - 20 Queen Street: Warbys Barn and Stables
 Campbelltown, 261 Queen Street: Campbelltown Post Office
 Campbelltown, 263 Queen Street: Commercial Banking Company of Sydney, Campbelltown Branch (former)
 Campbelltown, 284 - 298 Queen Street: Queen Street Buildings
 Campbelltown, 303 Queen Street: Dredges Cottage
 Denham Court, 238 Campbelltown Road: Denham Court (homestead)
 Gilead, 767 Appin Road: Beulah, Gilead
 Gilead, Menangle Road: Sugarloaf Farm
 Ingleburn, 196 Campbelltown Road: Robin Hood Farm
 Kearns, Mississippi Crescent: Epping Forest, Kearns
 Kentlyn, Darling Avenue: Bull Cave
 Leumeah, Holly Lea Road: Holly Lea and Plough Inn
 Macquarie Fields, Quarter Sessions Road: Macquarie Field House
 Menangle Park, Glenlee Road: Glenlee, Menangle Park
 Minto, Lot 315 Ben Lomond Road: Stone Cottage, Minto
 St Helens Park, Appin Road: Denfield
 St Helens Park, St Helens Park Drive: St Helen's Park
 Varroville, 196 St Andrews Road: Varroville (homestead)

Transport links

Road transport corridors
The principle access roads to and from Campbelltown are: 
 Appin Road and The Hume Highway to the south;
 Narellan Road to the west; and
 The Hume Highway and Cambridge Avenue to the north.
There is no direct eastern road access.
As a fast-growing regional centre, road infrastructure has yet to catch up with the historically strong population growth. Areas of greatest concern include congestion on Narellan Road, numerous road fatalities on Appin Road and the inadequate causeway over the Georges River at Cambridge Avenue, Glenfield.

Rail transport corridor
Campbelltown is served by trains on the Sydney suburban rail network (Sydney Trains), with railway stations:
 Macarthur 
 Campbelltown
 Leumeah
 Minto
 Ingleburn
 Macquarie Fields 
 Glenfield

Major council facilities
 Campbelltown Civic Centre, Queen Street, Campbelltown.
 Campbelltown Arts Centre, a contemporary arts centre located at the corner of Camden & Appin Roads, Campbelltown.
 Campbelltown Stadium, Leumeah, a sports stadium used mainly for football and rugby league.
 The Gordon Fetterplace Aquatic Centre, The Parkway, Bradbury.
 Eagle Vale Central, Emerald Drive, Eagle Vale.
 Macquarie Fields Indoor Sports Centre, Fields Road, Macquarie Fields.
 Macquarie Fields Leisure Centre, Fields Road, Macquarie Fields.
 HJ Daley Library, Hurley Street, Campbelltown.
 Greg Percival Library, corner of Oxford Road & Cumberland Road, Ingleburn.
 Glenquarie Library, Brooks Street, Macquarie Fields.

Festivals
 Festival of Fisher's Ghost: Held annually in the Campbelltown CBD every November. Campbelltown's biggest Festival and one of the longest running Festivals in Australia, dating back to 1956. Featuring 10 days of family fun with more than 30 events, including a grand parade of community groups a street fair, music gigs and fireworks.
 Ingleburn Alive! Festival: Held annually in Oxford Road in the Northern suburb of Ingleburn in March. Free entertainment, rides and family activities, usually followed by a firework display in Milton park.
 Riverfest, held annually in August in Koshigaya Park, to raise awareness of the city's local environment and cultural diversity.

See also

 Local government areas of New South Wales

References

External links 

 Campbelltown City Council website
 Festival of Fishers Ghost
 Australian Bureau of Statistics (National Regional Profile)
 Images of Campbelltown
 Image of Cambridge Ave causeway, Glenfield flooding
 Campbelltown Focus images of Campbelltown.

 
Macarthur (New South Wales)
Hume Highway
Georges River